Clevelândia is a municipality in the state of Paraná in the Southern Region of Brazil. Its name is an homage to American president Grover Cleveland.

The municipality contains part of the buffer zone of the  Mata Preta Ecological Station, a fully protected area created in 2005.

See also
List of municipalities in Paraná

References

Municipalities in Paraná